The Cleveland Torso Murderer, also known as the Mad Butcher of Kingsbury Run, was an unidentified serial killer who was active in Cleveland, Ohio, United States, in the 1930s. The killings were characterized by the dismemberment of twelve known victims and the disposal of their remains in the impoverished neighborhood of Kingsbury Run. Most victims came from an area east of Kingsbury Run called "The Roaring Third" or "Hobo Jungle", known for its bars, gambling dens, brothels, and vagrants. Despite an investigation of the murders, which at one time was led by famed lawman Eliot Ness, then Cleveland's Public Safety Director, the murderer was never apprehended.

Murders

The official number of murders attributed to the Cleveland Torso Murderer is twelve, although recent research has shown there could have been as many as twenty. The twelve known victims were killed between 1935 and 1938. Some investigators, including lead detective Peter Merylo, believe that there may have been thirteen or more victims in the Cleveland, Youngstown, and Pittsburgh areas between the 1920s and 1950s. Two strong candidates for addition to the initial list of those killed are the unknown victim nicknamed the "Lady of the Lake," found on September 5, 1934, and Robert Robertson, found on July 22, 1950.

The victims of the Torso Murderer were usually drifters whose identities were never determined, although there were a few exceptions. Victims numbers 2, 3, and 8 were identified as Edward Andrassy, Florence Polillo, and possibly Rose Wallace, respectively.  Edward Andrassy and Florence Polillo were both identified by their fingerprints, while Rose Wallace was tentatively identified via her dental records. The victims appeared to be lower class individuals – easy prey in Depression-era Cleveland. Many were known as "working poor", who had nowhere else to live but the ramshackle Depression-era shanty towns or "Hoovervilles" in the area known as the Cleveland Flats.

The Torso Murderer always beheaded and often dismembered the victims, occasionally severing the victim's torso in half or severing their appendages. In many cases the cause of death was the decapitation or dismemberment itself. Most of the male victims were castrated. Some victims showed evidence of chemical treatment being applied to their bodies, which caused the skin to become red, tough, and leathery. Many of the victims were found after a considerable period of time following their deaths, occasionally in excess of a year. In an era when forensic science was largely in its infancy, these factors further complicated identification, especially since the heads were often undiscovered.

During the time of the "official" murders, Eliot Ness held the position of Public Safety Director of Cleveland, a position with authority over the police department and ancillary services, including the fire department. While Ness had little to do with the investigation, his posthumous reputation as leader of The Untouchables has made him an irresistible character in modern "torso murder" lore. Ness did contribute to the arrest and interrogation of one of the prime suspects, Dr. Francis E. Sweeney. In addition, Ness personally conducted raids into hobo shanties and eventually burned down Kingsbury Run, from which the killer took their victims.  His reasoning for burning down the shanty towns was to catalog fingerprints to easily identify any new victims, and stated that it was also done to get possible victims out of the area in an attempt to stop the murders. Four days after the shantytown burning, on August 22, 1938, Ness launched an equally draconian operation of questionable legality, where he personally dispatched six two-man search teams on a large area of Cleveland, stretching from the Cuyahoga River to E. 55th Street to Prospect Avenue under the guise of conducting city fire inspections. This area of the city had long been supposed as the location of the Torso Murderer's "laboratory." Among the detectives dispatched and charged to look for signs of the Torso Murderer's activity in the area were Detectives Orley May, Emil Musil, Peter Merylo, and Martin Zalewski – men who had worked the case from the beginning and must have felt the frustrations of the case most strongly. While the search never turned up any new or incriminating information that could lead to the arrest and conviction of the Torso Murderer, the systemic search did serve to focus renewed public attention on the inadequate and unsanitary living conditions in the downtown Cleveland area. The teams uncovered hundreds of families living in hazardous fire traps without toilets or running water. The interests of social reform did ultimately come to light even if those of law enforcement did not.

At one point in time, the killer taunted Ness by placing the remains of two victims in full view of his office in city hall. The man who Eliot Ness believed was the killer would also provoke him by sending him postcards.

Victims
Most researchers consider there to be 12 victims, although some have counted as many as 20. Evidence suggests a woman dubbed "The Lady of the Lake" could be included. There was a second victim who was also considered to be a victim of the Torso Killer in 1950 named Robert Robertson due to the fact that his head was also cut off. Only three victims were positively identified; the other ten were six John Does and four Jane Does.

Possible victims
Several noncanonical victims are commonly discussed in connection with the Torso Murderer. The first was nicknamed the "Lady of the Lake" and was found near Euclid Beach on the Lake Erie shore on September 5, 1934. Only parts of her were found and matched with parts found at another shore in Perry. She had an abdominal scar from a likely hysterectomy which was common and made it more difficult to identify her. After she was found, several people reported seeing body parts in the water, including a group of fisherman who believed to have seen a head. She was found virtually in the same spot as canonical victim number 7. Some researchers of the Torso Murderer's victims count the "Lady of the Lake" as victim number 1, or "Victim Zero". Like the Lady of the Lake, John Doe I had some kind of substance on his skin (though his skin abnormalities could possibly be due to burning) when his body was found; however, at the time the similarities were not connected. The chemical was believed to have been a substance using lime chloride. It is supposed that the killer meant to use a quickening lime to decompose the bodies quicker but mistakenly used lime that would preserve bodies instead.

The headless body of an unidentified male was found in a boxcar in New Castle, Pennsylvania, on July 1, 1936. Three headless victims were found in boxcars near McKees Rocks, Pennsylvania, on May 3, 1940. All bore similar injuries to those inflicted by the Cleveland killer. Dismembered bodies were also found in the swamps near New Castle between the years 1921 and 1934 and between 1939 and 1942. In September 1940 an article in the New Castle News refers to the killer as "The Murder Swamp Killer". The almost identical similarities between the victims in New Castle to those in Cleveland, Ohio, coupled with the similarities between New Castle's Murder Swamp and Cleveland's Kingsbury Run, both of which were directly connected by a Baltimore and Ohio Railroad line, were enough to convince Cleveland Detective Peter Merylo that the New Castle murders were the work of the "Mad Butcher of Kingsbury Run". Merylo was convinced the connection was the railroad that ran twice a day between the two cities; he often rode the rails undercover looking for clues to the killer's identity.

On July 22, 1950, the body of 41-year-old Robert Robertson was found at a business at 2138 Davenport Avenue in Cleveland. Police believed he had been dead six to eight weeks and appeared to have been intentionally decapitated. His death appeared to fit the profile of other victims: He was estranged from his family, had an arrest record and a drinking problem, and was on the fringes of society. Despite widespread newspaper coverage linking the murder to the crimes in the 1930s, detectives investigating Robertson's death treated it as an isolated crime.

In 1939 the "Torso Killer" claimed to have killed a victim in Los Angeles, California. An investigation uncovered animal bones.
In addition to the murders in Cleveland it is also suspected that there are connected murders before and after in Sandusky and Youngstown, as well as New Castle, PA, and Selkirk, NY. If they are connected this would raise the body count, and raise more questions about travel ability. It would also create a longer timeline of murders and victims over the span of the years. In a time where most major travel was still by railway, and Cleveland being a major hub between some of these cities, it would be much more difficult to find viable suspects. It has also been theorized that the Cleveland Torso murder case has some connection to the Black Dahlia murder.

Suspects
Authorities interrogated around 9,100 people during the investigation to find the Torso Murderer. The case became the biggest police investigation in Cleveland history: Many were investigated and 1,000 crimes were solved from the dedicated police investigations. There were only two main suspects of the Torso Murders: Frank Dolezal and Francis E. Sweeney.

On August 24, 1939, a 52-year-old Cleveland resident named Frank Dolezal, who at one point lived with Polillo and also had connections to Andrassy and Wallace, was arrested as a suspect in Florence Polillo's murder; he later died in suspicious circumstances in the Cuyahoga County jail while in the custody of Cuyahoga County Sheriff Martin O'Donnell. Dolezal was posthumously exonerated of involvement in the Torso slayings.

Most investigators consider the last canonical murder to have been in 1938. One suspected individual was Dr. Francis E. Sweeney. Born May 5, 1894, Sweeney was a veteran of World War I who was part of a medical unit that conducted amputations in the field. After the war, Sweeney became an alcoholic due to pathological anxiety and depression derived from his wartime experiences. (His heavy drinking began in 1929; by 1934 his alcoholism lead to a separation from his wife.) Additionally, during his military service, Sweeney was gassed in combat, which resulted in nerve damage. Sweeney was later personally interviewed by Eliot Ness, who oversaw the official investigation into the killings in his capacity as Cleveland's Safety Director. Before the interrogation, Sweeney was detained, and he was found to be so intoxicated that he was held in a hotel room for 3 days until he sobered up.
During this interrogation, Sweeney is said to have "failed to pass" two very early polygraph machine tests. Both tests were administered by polygraph expert Leonarde Keeler, who told Ness he had his man. Ness apparently felt there was little chance of obtaining a successful prosecution of the doctor, especially as he was the first cousin of one of Ness's political opponents, Congressman Martin L. Sweeney, who had hounded Ness publicly about his failure to catch the killer. After Sweeney committed himself, there were no more leads or connections that police could assign to him as a possible suspect. From his hospital confinement, Sweeney sent threatening postcards and harassed Ness and his family into the 1950s; the postcards only stopped arriving after his death. Sweeney died in a veterans' hospital in Dayton on July 9, 1964. Sweeney was a viable suspect, but the evidence was circumstantial and would have no bearing. In 1929 he was a surgical resident at St. Alexis hospital in the Kingsbury Run area.  He also had  an office on the street where a man named Emil Fronek said a doctor tried to drug him in 1934. Fronek's story was discounted as he could not relocate the building with police the next day. Upon finding a victim with drugs in her system and looking through buildings it was found that Sweeney did have an office next to a coroner, in the area where Fronek had suggested he had been drugged. He would practice in their morgue, a clean and easy place to kill victims and not leave a mess due to the building being used to hold the dead anyway.

In addition to Dolezol and Sweeney, authorities also considered Willie Johnson, an African-American male who committed a similar murder in June 1942, as a suspect.  Johnson had been spotted by a young girl while disposing of a trunk, which was later found to contain the torso of 19-year-old Margaret Frances Wilson. Wilson's head and arms were found in nearby bushes, while her legs would be found at Johnson's home two weeks later.  It was claimed that he was acquainted with Rose Wallace and, possibly, Flo Polillo, but, while Coroner Samuel Gerber touted him as a suspect, he was never conclusively linked to the Torso Murders. Johnson was tried and convicted of Wilson's murder and, after a lengthy psychological evaluation, was executed by electric chair on March 10, 1944.

In 1997, another theory postulated that there may have been no single Butcher of Kingsbury Run—that the murders could have been committed by different people. This was based on the assumption that the autopsy results were inconclusive. First, Cuyahoga County Coroner Arthur J. Pearce may have been inconsistent in his analysis as to whether the cuts on the bodies were expert or slapdash. Second, his successor, Samuel Gerber, who began to enjoy press attention from his involvement in such cases as the Sam Sheppard murder trial, garnered a reputation for sensational theories. Therefore, the only thing known for certain was that all the murder victims were dismembered. Elliot Ness was said to have taken the killer's identity to his grave.

Peter Merylo believed that the Torso Murderer could be a transient who was riding the rails. Most of the murders occurred within the vicinity of railroad tracks. Peter Merylo went undercover as a hobo to investigate this idea. He believed that this was the reason why there were murders in other states that were similar to the Torso Murders in Cleveland.

In popular culture 
The 2018 film The Kingsbury Run was based on a modern copycat of the murders.

The murders and the hunt for the perpetrators were covered in an episode of Unsolved Mysteries.

See also
 Black Dahlia, a Los Angeles murder case that some investigators have suggested may have been committed by the same killer.
 Orley May, detective who worked on the case
 Thames Torso Murders, another series of murders in which the torsos of victims were left behind

General:
 List of fugitives from justice who disappeared
 List of serial killers in the United States

References

Notes

Citations

Bibliography
 
 
  Paperback.
 
  Hardback.
  Paperback.
 
 
 Collins, Max Allan and A. Brad Schwartz. Eliot Ness and the Mad Butcher: Hunting America's Deadliest Unidentified Serial Killer at the Dawn of Modern Criminology. New York: HarperCollins, 2020. 
  Paperback.
  Paperback, second edition 2002.
  Paperback
 
 
 Paperback..
 
 Stashower, Daniel (6 September 2022). American Demon: Eliot Ness and the Hunt for America's Jack the Ripper. Minotaur Books. ISBN 1250041163.

External links

Cleveland Torso Murders
Google Map of the Torso Murders
The Kingsbury Run Murders

1935 in Ohio
1935 murders in the United States
1930s in Cleveland
American serial killers
Cleveland Division of Police
Crimes in Cleveland
Murder in Ohio
Unidentified American serial killers
Unsolved murders in the United States